James Harrison Earnest (January 11, 1818June 12, 1900) was an American Democratic politician and Wisconsin pioneer.  He served four years in the Wisconsin State Senate and six years in the Assembly, representing Lafayette County.

Background
James Earnest was born in Franklin, Kentucky, in 1818.  His parents died while he was still young, and, when he was about sixteen years old, he went to Springfield, Illinois, to look for work.  In 1836, he moved north into the Wisconsin Territory and settled at the township of New Diggings.  He found work in the lead mines, and, after 1844, opened a store in the town and operated his own mining company.

In 1850, he used his earnings to purchase an unimproved farmstead in the vicinity of Shullsburg, Wisconsin.  He constructed a home and other buildings on the property.

In politics, he became an outspoken supporter of the Democratic Party, which was popular with the laborers in the lead mining region.  Over the next several decades, he was elected to six terms in the Wisconsin State Assembly, and two 2-year terms in the Wisconsin State Senate.  He was a constant defender of the economic interests of the lead mining region, until the industry began to decline in the aftermath of the American Civil War.

In his later years, he devoted his attention to his farmstead, where he raised thoroughbred livestock.

He died at his homestead near Shullsburg on June 12, 1900, after a long illness.

Personal life and family
James Earnest married Mary E. McGown of Mercer County, Kentucky, in 1847.  They had eight children together, all of whom were still living at the time of his death in 1900.

References

External links
 

People from Franklin, Kentucky
People from Shullsburg, Wisconsin
Democratic Party Wisconsin state senators
Democratic Party members of the Wisconsin State Assembly
1818 births
1900 deaths
19th-century American politicians